Times Square Lady is a 1935 American crime drama film directed by George B. Seitz and starring Robert Taylor, Virginia Bruce and Helen Twelvetrees. It was produced and distributed by Metro-Goldwyn-Mayer.

Synopsis
Toni Bradley comes to New York from Iowa to take over her late father's business, most of which involved gambling. Her father's former associates plan to take the business away from her but with the help of one of them, Steve Gordon who changes sides and a songwriter Pinky Tomlin, she manages to fight back.

Reception
According to MGM records the film earned $310,000 in the US and Canada and $114,000 elsewhere, making a profit of $131,000.

Cast
 Robert Taylor as Steve Gordon
 Virginia Bruce as Toni Bradley
 Pinky Tomlin as 	Pinky Tomlin of Durant Oklahoma
 Helen Twelvetrees as Margo Heath
 Isabel Jewell as 	'Babe'
 Nat Pendleton as 	Mack
 Jack La Rue as 	Jack Kramer 
 Henry Kolker as 	Mr. Fielding
 Raymond Hatton as 'Slim' Kennedy
 Russell Hopton as 	Ed Brennan
 Fred Kohler as 'Dutch' Meyers
 Robert Elliott as 'Brick' Culver
 Paul Stanton as Barney Engel 
 George Irving as 	Mr. Ashton
 Pat Flaherty as 	Buck Pierson, Hockey Player
 Ward Bond as Dugan, Hockey Player
 Dick Elliott as 	Stage Doorman 
 Tyler Brooke as Casa Nova Bandmaster
 Beatrice Roberts as Casa Nova Patron 
 Ellinor Vanderveer as 	Casa Nova Patron

References

Bibliography
 Quirk, Lawrence J. The Films of Robert Taylor. Citadel Press, 1975.

External links
Times Square Lady details, tcm.com; accessed August 10, 2015.

1935 films
Metro-Goldwyn-Mayer films
1935 crime drama films
American crime drama films
American black-and-white films
Films scored by Edward Ward (composer)
1930s English-language films
1930s American films
Films directed by George B. Seitz
Films set in New York City